Joseph Aloysius Sweeney (13 June 1897 – 25 November 1980) was an Irish politician and military commander. He fought in the Easter Rising in the GPO and was a member of the IRA during the war of independence. He later became Chief of Staff of the Irish Army.

Background
Sweeney was born and raised in Burtonport, a town in The Rosses, a district in the west of County Donegal. He was the son of general merchant John Sweeney and Margaret O'Donnell. He came from an Irish Nationalist family; his father had been jailed during the Land War as well as being a president of the local branch of the Ancient Order of Hibernians and a founder of the Irish Volunteers in Donegal.  He received his secondary education at St. Enda's School in Rathfarnham, where Patrick Pearse was Headmaster. Pearse solidified Sweeney's nationalist beliefs, and in 1914 Sweeney joined the Irish Volunteers himself. By September 1914 he was a student in University College Dublin and he had transferred to Pearse's unit in the Dublin Brigade, which styled itself "Pearse's own" and had many former students of Pearse amongst their number. In 1915 Sweeney was sworn into the Irish Republican Brotherhood by Pearse.

Easter Rising
Sweeney was active during the events of the Easter Rising, where he fought in Dublin's Liberty Hall and later the GPO. Following the surrender of rebel forces, Sweeney was interned in Frongoch internment camp in Wales. By October 1916, he'd been released, whereupon he rejoined the Volunteers and once again resumed his studies at UCD. During the following summers he returned to Donegal and reorganised the Volunteers in that county.

Irish revolutionary period
In 1918 Sweeney was suffering from influenza and decided to take a break from UCD and return to Donegal. While there he was appointed a commandant of the local Volunteers as well as being elected as a Sinn Féin MP for Donegal West in the 1918 Irish general election, defeating the sitting nationalist Hugh Law. Aged 21, had he taken his seat in the British Commons he would have been the youngest member of the house, however, as per Sinn Féin's abstentionist policy he did not and instead attended the meeting of the First Dáil, the new parliament of Ireland created by the Nationalists. He was the youngest Teachta Dála that day and he remains second youngest ever TD to date.

In March 1920 he was arrested and jailed by the British authorities, first being sent to Belfast before being transferred to Wormwood Scrubs, London. He was released in April 1920 following his participation in a mass hunger strike by Irish prisoners against their imprisonment. Following his release, he became Officer Commanding of the West Donegal Brigade of the Irish Republican Army and fought in the Irish War of Independence. During that time he rose through the ranks and became the commanding officer of the 1st Northern Division.

Following the end of the War of Independence and the signing of the Anglo-Irish Treaty, Sweeney chose the Pro-Treaty side in the Irish Civil War. In the lead-up to the civil war, he was involved in smuggling arms across the border to northern nationalists, which lead to clashes with British troops. During one such clash seven of his men were killed at Pettigo.

In 1921 he was one of six Sinn Féin candidates elected unopposed to the House of Commons of Southern Ireland for Donegal. Again he did not attend and instead participated in the Second Dáil. In 1922 he was re-elected as a Pro-Treaty Sinn Féin candidate for Donegal and participated in the Third Dáil.

During the Civil War, he was made a General in the newly formed National Army and placed in command of its units in the North-West of the Island. The period saw Sweeney execute a number of captured Republicans, including a former friend, Charlie Daly.

Life in the Irish Free State
In 1923 he choose to leave politics and did not try to retain his seat as a TD. Instead, he remained in the National Army. In 1924 he was briefly acting Chief of Staff during the Irish Army Mutiny. By 1929 he had risen to the rank of Chief of Staff proper, a promotion that happened to coincide with the rise of Fianna Fáil to government. Many feared an outbreak of violence once again if Cumann na nGaedheal did not accept this change. Sweeney declared his view on the matter, stating that the will of the people would be protected under his command.

Sweeney remained in the Army until his retirement in December 1940. He later became Secretary of the Irish Red Cross in the Republic of Ireland.

Having spent most of his life in Dublin, he died in 1980 aged 83 before being buried in a full military ceremony back in Burtonport, Donegal.

References

1897 births
1980 deaths
Chiefs of Staff of the Defence Forces (Ireland)
Military personnel from County Donegal
Early Sinn Féin TDs
Members of the 1st Dáil
Members of the 2nd Dáil
Members of the 3rd Dáil
Members of the Parliament of the United Kingdom for County Donegal constituencies (1801–1922)
National Army (Ireland) generals
People of the Irish Civil War (Pro-Treaty side)
Politicians from County Donegal
UK MPs 1918–1922
People educated at St. Enda's School